Fall River is a suburban community located in Nova Scotia, Canada within the Halifax Regional Municipality. It is located north-northeast of the Bedford Basin, northeast of Bedford and Lower Sackville and north of Waverley.

Fall River's name is derived from a stream running between Miller Lake and Lake Thomas which had a waterfall.  These falls supplied water power for several mills during the 19th century as well as a local electrical utility during the early 20th century.  The waterfall was demolished in the late 1950s as a result of the construction of the Bicentennial Highway leading to Halifax;  the waterfall was located where the 4-lane expressway currently runs up the hill from the crossing of Lake Thomas to the interchange with Highway 118 at Miller Lake.  Hydro-electric power is now generated by a tunnel that carries the water from Miller Lake which once flowed through this stream and down the waterfall. Turbines produce electricity for the main grid, during peak periods.

History

The Mi'kmaq Nation and its predecessors were known to have inhabited Fall River prior to European settlement, using the waterways for a portage route connecting with the Shubenacadie Valley.  The Mik'maq reportedly used this waterway to attack the settlement at Halifax in its early days during a conflict with English settlers.

The first European people in the area arrived during the late 18th century, and some of these earliest settlers were German. In particular one German family named Muller (now anglicized to Miller) established themselves in Fall River, and some of their descendants remain in the area, with Miller Lake being named after them.  The Miller brothers, Philip and John, cleared the land on the east side of Lake Thomas and in 1828 built a dam to power their sawmill, the first in the area. George Taylor, another settler, had come to Fall River in 1829 and was innkeeper of The Lakeside Inn, which was in operation as early as 1831.

In the 1830s, Charles P. Allen operated a water-powered mill on the falls at Miller lake, where he manufactured furniture. The Shubenacadie Canal was operating during the 1850s, and this waterway, which connected Halifax Harbour to the Minas Basin, ran through Fall River by way of the lakes, and the now tumbled-down cut stones of the canal-locks can be still be seen at the meeting of Lake Thomas and Fletcher Lake. Fletcher Lake was named after Robert Fletcher, who operated an inn and way station on the stagecoach road (Cobequid Road) to Truro, at the site of the present day locks, during the 1830s and 1840s. At the north end of Miller Lake stood Rutherfords Inn which operated from the 1840s through to the 1870s. This inn had a rich reputation for entertainment, and was frequented by miners from the nearby gold fields at Waverley and by militia men and parties from Dartmouth.

Around 1902, there was a wooden aqueduct over a mile long, which carried water from Miller Lake along the top of Gunns Mountain to Waverley, where the power from it was used in gold mining in that village. While not on the same scale as nearby Waverley, the only gold diggings in Fall River were mainly located on the east side of Miller Lake in the late 1890s and early 20th century. A few hundred ounces were produced. In the year 1900, the first telephone was installed in Fall River. Charles Carr operated an early post office in his store in the village. It was located on the corner of Fall River Rd and Hwy #2, near the bridge. The store and post office was there as early as 1910-15, and many Carr family descendants still reside in the area.

Through the later part of the 19th century and early 20th century, Fall River was largely a sleepy little village and grew little in population. In 1921 the Lake Thomas Ice Company was in operation in Fall River and continued until about 1948, operated by the Wilson family. In 1926 the Waverley Game Sanctuary was created, surrounding the east side of Miller Lake and containing large tracts of land within the rugged interior east of Soldier Lake. Also in 1926, the Boy Scouts built a summer camp on Lone Cloud Island in Miller Lake, which is still in use today. There was a blacksmith shop operated by the Millers during the 1930s, located on the east side of Lake Thomas, and the old building is still there as late as 2010. The old general store of Neil Miller was a major fixture in the village, dating from October 14, 1952 until 1987.

In 1954 local resident Graeme Stuart, whose family had come to Fall River from Scotland in the mid-19th century, founded Stuart Industries. The metal fabricating business at its peak employed about 100 men and operated in Fall River until about 1982. Going back to the 1940s, an old service station built and operated by the Spencer family and later owned by the MacArthurs, is still in operation and is now operated and owned by local resident Gerald Burgess. The service station is next to the original Fall River School that later became the Recreation Centre and even later a commercial building.

Demographics 

Growth
Fall River has been expanding rapidly with the construction of a Sobeys and surrounding shopping centre, McDonald's, Subway and Tim Hortons. Lockview High School opened its doors in 2000 to relieve strain on the aging Charles P. Allen High School in Bedford. Fall River also has two elementary schools, Holland Road Elementary School and Ash Lee Jefferson Elementary School. Ash Lee Jefferson Elementary School was named after Mrs. Ada Lee, Mrs. Selena Jefferson and Mrs. Martha Ash, all of whom are remembered for their extraordinary humanitarian efforts, moral and Christian leadership in the community of Fall River. There is also one junior high: Georges P. Vanier. Due to the increased presence of schools and retail, Fall River serves as a hub for neighboring communities.

There are four major subdivisions in Fall River, the first being called The Schwarzwald (named after the famed Black Forest in Germany) and developed by the Miller family in the mid-1970s. Schwarzwald has in the past decade started development of a new section called Schwarzwald Heights, which branches off of Trunk Highway 2. The second subdivision being Fall River Village. Also Capilano is the third major subdivision, with the Ashburn golf course just outside.

There are three new subdivisions, St. Andrews West and Kinloch Estates, which opened in February 2009.  The subdivision itself is nestled between St. Andrews Lake and Kinsac Lake with extensive waterfrontage on both lakes. Also, Miller Lake West located near the end of Perrin Drive (actually north of Miller Lake) has developed over the last six to seven years with larger homes and properties offering a feel of country living minutes from the city.

An up-scale development is also located on Guildwood Drive on the eastern shore of Miller Lake, having large properties with extensive waterfrontage. Tillmann Brook, a nearby waterway to this development, runs from Soldier Lake and empties into Miller Lake. This waterway is also named for another older Fall River family by the name of Tillmann, who also originated in Germany, although coming later to the area just after World War II, around 1947.  Near Tillmann Brook at Miller Lake are the old Fall River Stables.  It is now closed.

A new fire station and recreation/sports center for Fall River, the Gordon R. Snow Community Centre/Fire Station 45, opened in October 2008. It is named after Gordon R. Snow, a former councillor and resident of the community.

The skate park at the Rec Centre was opened in October 2008. It is a large concrete bowl style park, with a few handrails and ledges. The Rec Center itself opened in February 2009, which has a gym, offices, a fire hall and event room.

Waterways

There are many lakes in Fall River and its surrounding communities of Wellington, Waverley, Windsor Junction and Lakeview.  There is an eighteen-hole golf course, Ashburn Golf Club, and two parks, Laurie Provincial Park and Oakfield Provincial Park.

Lake Thomas and Lake Fletcher in Fall River form a section of the Shubenacadie Canal, which connects the Bay of Fundy with the Halifax Harbour.

Soldier Lake, a large reservoir lying almost completely within the boundaries of the game sanctuary.

Johnson River, a small river emptying into the east side of Soldier Lake and originating in the rugged interior of the game sanctuary.

Third Lake, the third in a series of lakes starting in Lower Sackville.  Third Lake forms part of the western boundary of Fall River

Kinsac Lake, a large lake, part of which forms another section of the western boundary of Fall River

Miller Lake, a reservoir which empties into Lake Thomas. Home to the Miller Lake Dragon of Camp Lone Cloud, a familiar summer sight out in the lake, near the #102 Highway.

German Creek, a small waterway which flows from the Gunn Ponds, under Perrin Drive into Miller Lake.

References

External links 

General Service Areas in Nova Scotia
Communities in Halifax, Nova Scotia
Designated places in Nova Scotia